Qura al-Assad (Arabic: قرى الأسد) is a Syrian village in the Qudsaya District of the Rif Dimashq Governorate. According to the Syria Central Bureau of Statistics (CBS), Qura al-Assad had a population of 1,067 in the 2004 census.

References

External links

Populated places in Qudsaya District